Hefei Feicui TV Tower is a tower under construction in Hefei, China.

References

Buildings and structures in Hefei
Buildings and structures under construction in China
Towers in China